Jayne is used both as a surname and as a given name.

Surname
Billy Jayne, American television and film actor
Caroline Furness Jayne (1873–1909), American ethnologist
Erika Jayne, American dance/club music performer
Francis Jayne (1845–1921), British bishop and academic
Horace Jayne (1859–1913), American biologist, zoologist, professor at the University of Pennsylvania and author
Ira W. Jayne (born 1882), American judge
Jennifer Jayne (1931–2006), English film and television actress
Joey Jayne, Democratic Party member of the Montana House of Representatives
Joseph Lee Jayne (1863–1928), rear admiral in the United States Navy, veteran of the Spanish–American War and World War I
Keith Jayne (born 1960), a British television actor
Mark Jayne, American wrestler
Mitchell F. Jayne (1928–2010), emcee and upright bass player in The Dillards bluegrass band
Randy Jayne (born 1944), Managing Partner at Heidrick & Struggles
Robert Jayne (born 1973), American actor
Roland Everett Jayne (1886–1937), Methodist clergyman and biographer
Richard Jayne (1930-2022), Historian and prisoner of war
Sam Jayne, vocalist/guitarist of indie band Love as Laughter, formerly of Lync.
Silas Carter Jayne (1907–1987), implicated in the 1955 murder of three young boys in Chicago
William Jayne (1826–1916), Abraham Lincoln’s personal physician, first Governor of the Dakota Territory, Delegate to the House of Representatives, three terms as mayor of Springfield, Il, from 1876

Given name
Jayne Appel (born 1988), basketball player
Jayne V. Armstrong (fl. 1996), British botanist
Jayne Atkinson (born 1959), English film, theatre and television actress
Jayne Baxter, Scottish Labour Party politician
Sarah-Jayne Blakemore, Professor of Cognitive Neuroscience at University College London
Jayne Brook (born 1960), American actress
Jayne Casey (born 1956), English artistic director
Jayne Cobb, a character from the television series Firefly
Jayne Cortez (1934–2012), African-American poet, activist, small press publisher and spoken-word performance artist
Jayne County (born 1947), American performer, musician and actress
Katrina Jayne Dimaranan (born 1993), Filipino-American beauty pageant titleholder
Sarah Jayne Dunn (born 1981), English actress
Jayne Eastwood (born 1946), Canadian actress
Jayne Furlong, New Zealand girl abducted in 1993 and murdered
Jayne Gackenbach, writer and dream researcher
Mary Jayne Gold (1909–1997), American heiress, helped European Jews and intellectuals escape Nazi Germany in 1940-1941
Jayne Grayson, a character from the television series Holby City
Mary Jayne Harrelson (born 1978), female middle distance runner from the United States
Jayne Hayden (born 1968), former operative for the Central Intelligence Agency
Jayne Heitmeyer (born 1960), Canadian actress
Jayne Hepsibah, milliner
David Jayne Hill (1850–1932), American academic, diplomat and author
Jayne Houdyshell (born 1953), Tony Award–nominated American theater actress
Jayne Hughes, the Deputy High Bailiff and Judicial Officer of the Isle of Man
Jayne Irving (born 1956), British TV presenter
Jayne Jagot, Australian judge
Jayne Fenton Keane, contemporary Australian poet
Jayne Kennedy (born 1951), American actress, beauty pageant titleholder and sportscaster
Jayne Ann Krentz, née Jayne Castle (born 1948), American writer of romance novels
Jayne Lawless (born 1974), English installation artist from Liverpool
Jayne Loader (born 1951), American director and writer
Jayne Ludlow (born 1979), Welsh football coach and former player
Jayne Mansfield (1933–1967), American actress in film, theatre, and television
Jayne Marie Mansfield (born 1950), the first child of Jayne Mansfield
Jayne McHugh (born 1960), former volleyball player
Jayne Meadows (born 1919), American stage, film and television actress, author and lecturer
Jayne Middlemiss (born 1971), English television and radio presenter
E. Jayne Mockler, Democratic member of the Wyoming Senate
Jayne Modean (born 1958), American model and actress
Sarah-Jayne Mulvihill (1973–2006), Flight Lieutenant in the Royal Air Force who died in Iraq
Jayne Parsons (born 1962), New Zealand paralympic cyclist
Jayne Anne Phillips (born 1952), American novelist and short story writer
Jayne Pierson, Welsh fashion designer
Jayne Pupek (1962–2010), American poet and fiction writer
Jayne Walton Rosen (1917–2010), American entertainer, singer and actress
Jayne Sharp (born 1977), English broadcaster
Jayne Torvill, OBE (born 1957), British ice dancer
Jayne Trcka, amateur female bodybuilder and actress
Jayne Tunnicliffe (born 1967), English actress
Jayne West, American operatic soprano
Emma-Jayne Wilson (born 1981), Sovereign and Eclipse Award-winning jockey in Thoroughbred horse racing
Jayne Wisener (born 1987), actress and singer from Northern Ireland
Jayne Wrightsman (born 1919), American philanthropist, fine arts collector widow of Charles B. Wrightsman

See also
Jayna
Jaynes
Jane (given name)
Jain (disambiguation)
Jaine

English feminine given names